S.K.D.A.V. Government Polytechnic is a state-run co-education engineering college located in Basanti Colony of Rourkela. The Institute was originally named S.K.D.A.V Government Polytechnic for Women. It was established in the year 1967 by Sushilavati Khosla with the help of D.A.V Trust.

The Institute is affiliated to All India Council of Technical Education, New Delhi and State Council for Technical Education & Vocational Training recognized under state Government of Odisha.

History
S.K.D.A.V Government Polytechnic for Women was established in 1967 by Sushilavati Khosla, the wife of ex- Odisha governor Dr. Ajudhia Nath Khosla. She donated Rs one lakh in collaboration with D.A.V Trust. In 1974, administration and funding was assumed by the Government of Odisha. By 1990 the institute had a new campus located at Bansanti Colony.

Initially the institution offered courses in Electronics and Telecommunication Engineering and Information Science. Subsequently, from 2001 to 2010 the institute added programs in Electrical Engineering, Information Technology and Civil Engineering.

From 1967 to 2012 the Institute enrolled exclusively female students from the state of Odisha. In 2013 the Government of Odisha opened the Institute to males as well, and changed its name from  S.K.D.A.V. Government Polytechnic for Women's to S.K.D.A.V. Government Polytechnic.

Courses 
The Institute offer 3 year Diploma Engineering and office management in:
Civil Engineering
Electrical Engineering
Information Technology
Modern Office Management
Electronics & Telecommunication Engineering 
Library & Information Science 2-year duration
The institute also offers:
Diploma in Industrial Safety for B.Tech, Diploma and B.Sc degree holders.

Admission procedure
The students are admitted through DET Orissa entrance test. Eligibility is limited to:
Students of HSE or equivalent in CBSE, ICSE, CHSE and BSE.
Students of ITI can apply for lateral entry program.

See also 
Sushilavati Government Women’s College, Rourkela

References 

State Council for Technical Education & Vocational Training
All India Council for Technical Education
Engineering colleges in Odisha
Universities and colleges in Rourkela
Educational institutions established in 1967
1967 establishments in Orissa